Bank Muamalat Indonesia (BMI) is a commercial bank in Indonesia operating on the principles of Islamic banking. The bank was founded in 1991, based on the initiative of the Indonesian Council of Ulamas (MUI) and under the auspices of the Government of Indonesia. Operations began in 1992. foreign exchange service began in 1994. Funding products apply the principles of wadiah (deposit) and mudarabah (profit-sharing). Financing products apply the principles of bai’ (buy and sell), musharakah (equity sharing), mudarabah, and ijarah (rent). Bank Muamalat serves nearly 3,000,000 customers throughout Indonesia and Malaysia.

Currently 82.65% stake of Bank Muamalat is owned by a government agency Hajj Fund Management Agency (BPKH), followed by Andre Mirza Hartawan (commissioner of the bank, 5.19%) and the public (12.16%).

Network 
To date, the Bank has 239 service offices and also supported by an extensive service network consisting of 568 Muamalat ATM units, 120,000 ATM Bersama and Prima ATM networks, 51 Mobile Cash Car units. The bank has also opened branches abroad, in Kuala Lumpur, Malaysia.

External links
 Official website

References

Banks of Indonesia
Islamic banks of Indonesia
Banks established in 1991
Indonesian companies established in 1991